The Institute of Mathematics of the Federal University of Rio de Janeiro (IM-UFRJ) is a teaching, research and extension unit. A unit of the Center for Mathematical and Natural Sciences (CCMN), located at Campus do Fundão in Cidade Universitária, Rio de Janeiro.

History
The Institute of Mathematics of UFRJ (IMFRJ) was created by Resolution No. 22, of the University Council of the University of Brazil, on March 19, 1964, and was maintained by Decree No. 60455-A of March 13, 1967, which approved the Restructuring Plan of UFRJ, former University of Brazil, had its origin in the Departments of Mathematics of the former National School of Engineering and the extinct National Faculty of Philosophy of the former University of Brazil; when the implementation of the so-called University Reform began. It was institutionalized as a unit of the Center for Mathematical Sciences and Nature (CCMN), by Decree No. 66,536, dated May 6, 1970, which approved the Statute of UFRJ.

Departments and research areas
The smallest fraction of the structure of the university is the department. Your responsibility is to plan, execute and coordinate research and teaching in your area of expertise. He is responsible for the didactic orientation of the subjects.

Departments
Department of Mathematics
Department of Computer Science 
Department of Statistical Methods
Department of Applied Mathematics

Research areas

References

External links
 The Mathematical Institute website

Mathematical institutes
Mathematics departments in Brazil
Federal University of Rio de Janeiro